The following is a timeline of the history of the city of Braga, Portugal.

Prior to 20th century

 ca. 41 BCE - Installation of Roman milestones begins.
 ca.16 BCE - Roman  founded.
 3rd C. CE - Town walls built.
 ca.300 CE - Victor of Braga is martyred.
 4th C. CE - Roman Catholic diocese of Braga established.
 5th C. CE - Suevi in power.
 ca.450s - Roman Catholic Archdiocese of Braga established.
 ca.485 - Visigoths in power.
 561-563 - Religious council meets in Braga.
 572 - Religious council meets in Braga.
 675 - Religious council meets in Braga.
 8th C. - Moors in power.
 1040 - Braga taken by forces of Ferdinand I.
 1089 - Braga Cathedral consecrated.
 1093 - Braga becomes seat of royal court (until 1147).
 1417 - Fernando da Guerra becomes archbishop.
 1494 - Printing press in operation.
 1616 - Ponte do Prado (bridge) to Vila Verde rebuilt.
 1642 - Construction of Igreja de Santa Cruz (church) begins.
 1756 - Braga City Hall built.
 1841 -  (library) founded.
 1857 - Public gas lighting installed.
 1858 - Population: 30,175.
 1875 - Ramal de Braga (railway) begins operating;  opens.
 1880 - Rua D. Frei Caetano Brandão (street) developed.
 1882 - Bom Jesus do Monte Funicular begins operating.
 1888 - Livraria Cruz (bookshop) in business.
 1893 - Public electric lighting installed.
 1900 - Population: 24,202.

20th century
 1911 - Population: 24,647 in town; 382,461 in district.
 1914 -  begins operating.
 1915 - Theatre Circo (theatre) opens.
 1917 -  (archive) founded.
 1918 - D. Diogo de Sousa Museum founded.
 1919 -  newspaper begins publication.
 1921 - S.C. Braga (football club) formed.
 1926 - 28 May 1926 coup d'état begins in Braga.
 1929 - Airfield begins operating in Palmeira.
 1936 - City becomes seat of newly formed Minho Province.
 1950 - Estádio Municipal 28 de Maio (stadium) opens.
 1955 - Jardim de Santa Bárbara (garden) created.
 1961 - Hospital opens.
 1963 - Trolleybus begins operating.
 1973 - University of Minho established.
 1977 - Mesquita Machado becomes mayor (almost continually until 2013).
 1978 - Biscainhos Museum opens.
 1982 -  (transit entity) established.
 1993 - Circuito Vasco Sameiro (vehicular racetrack) opens.
 1999 -  in business in São Victor.

21st century
 2001
 Cm-braga.pt website online (approximate date).
 Population: 112,039 in city; 831,366 in district.
 2002 -  (arena) opens.
 2003 - Estádio Municipal de Braga (stadium) opens.
 2004
 Completion of the works of modernization and electrification of Oporto–Braga railway line, which included the construction of a new building for Braga railway station. The modernisation allowed the extension of the high-speed Alfa Pendular trains from Oporto to Braga, a service which started on June 5, 2004.
  (library) opens.
 Part of UEFA Euro 2004 football contest played in Braga.
 2011 - Population: 181,819 in city; 848,185 in district.
 2013
 Ricardo Rio becomes mayor.
 União das Freguesias de Braga created.
 2014 - Organ Festival of Braga begins.

See also
 Braga history
 
 Ecclesiastical history of Braga
  since 1836
 List of bishops of Braga
 List of governors of Braga district (in Portuguese)
 
 Timelines of other cities/municipalities in Portugal: Coimbra, Funchal (Madeira), Lisbon, Porto, Setúbal

References

This article incorporates information from the Portuguese Wikipedia.

Bibliography

in English
 
 
 
 
 
 
   (Bibliography)

in Portuguese
 
 
 
 
 
 
 
 
 Eduardo Pires de Oliveira. As alterações toponímicas 1380–1980, Braga, 1982
 Eduardo Pires de Oliveira et al. Braga Evolução da Estrutura Urbana, Braga, 1982
 José Marques. Braga Medieval, Braga, 1983
 Alberto Feio, (1984), Coisas Memoráveis de Braga (in Portuguese)
 José Manuel da Silva Passos, (1996), O Bilhete Postal Ilustrado e a História Urbana de Braga (in Portuguese), Lisbon

External links

 Arquivo Municipal da Câmara Municipal de Braga (city archives)
 
 

 
Braga
Braga
Years in Portugal